Nea Kameni is a small uninhabited Greek island of volcanic origin located in the Aegean Sea, within the flooded Santorini caldera. Nea Kameni and the neighbouring small island Palea Kameni (the new and old burnt islands) have formed over the past two millennia through repeated eruptions of dacite lava and ash. The Roman historian Cassius Dio records in the year 47 CE "This year a small islet, hitherto unknown, made an appearance close to the island of Thera." Cassius' report may refer to Palaia Kameni. Pliny the Elder reports a new island emerging on July 8, in the year of the consulship of M. Junius Silanus and L. Balbus, thus 19 CE. 

Major eruptions over the past 300 years took place in 1707–1712, 1866–1870, 1925–1928, and 1939–1941. The last small eruption happened in 1950 and involved lava dome extrusion. 

Nea Kameni is nearly round, and has a diameter of approximately 2 kilometers and an area of 3.4 km2. It is monitored closely by scientists from the Institute for the Study and Monitoring of the Santorini Volcano (ISMOSAV), and is a protected scientific site. The island has many active sulfur vents, as well as a carpet of red grassy succulents on the thin soil in the summertime.

The nearly barren island is visited daily by dozens of tourist boats throughout the summer. Visitors climb a gravel path to reach the top of the 130-meter-high volcanic crater, where it is possible to complete a full circuit of the rim.

References

External links
Nea Kameni Virtual Tour, Volcano 360 Panorama Virtual Tour in High Resolution *Dead link*

Santorini
New islands
Volcanoes of Greece
Volcanoes of the Aegean
Uninhabited islands of Greece
Landforms of Thira (regional unit)
Islands of the South Aegean
Islands of Greece